Chelsea Chelsea Bang Bang is a book by Chelsea Handler that was published in March 2010.

Synopsis
The book consists of humorous essays written by Chelsea about her various life experiences. The essays are often blatantly vulgar, much like the ones in Handler's previous two published books.

Essays
The chapters (essays) in the book are as follows:
 "The Feeling"
 "When Life Hands You Lemons, Squeeze Them Into Your Vodka"
 "Grey Gardens"
 "Dudley"
 "Wedding Chopper"
 "Water Olympics"
 "Black-on-Black Crime"
 "Dear Asshole"
 "The Suspect"
 "Chunk"
 "Deep Thoughts by Chelsea Handy"

Sales and recognition
Chelsea Chelsea Bang Bang hit Number 1 on the New York Times Nonfiction Hardback Bestseller list on March 21, 2010. That same week, her previous books, 'Are You There, Vodka? It's Me, Chelsea' and 'My Horizontal Life: A Collection of One Night Stands", hit numbers 2 and 3 on the paperback list.

Tour
In 2010, Handler embarked on a tour to promote the book. For the tour, Handler switched her sponsor from Grey Goose to Belvedere Vodka, joking that Belvedere is the healthier option.

References

Essay collections
2010 non-fiction books
Books by Chelsea Handler